David Colin Beatson (14 April 1944 – 21 September 2017) was a New Zealand journalist, media analyst and broadcast presenter. He was editor of the New Zealand Listener in the 1980s. He worked as Chief Press Secretary to 1990s New Zealand Prime Minister Jim Bolger.

Beatson died on 21 September 2017, following a lengthy undisclosed illness.

References

1944 births
2017 deaths
New Zealand broadcasters